Kand Tappeh (also Romanized as Kand Tepe) is a village in Kuhin Rural District, in the Central District of Kabudarahang County, Hamadan Province, Iran. At the 2006 census, its population was 337, in 69 families.

References 

Populated places in Kabudarahang County